The Communist Party of Bohemia and Moravia (KSČM) held a leadership election on 5 November 1999. Miroslav Grebeníček was elected for another term as the leader. Grebeníček received over 70% and defeated his rivals Václav Exner and Miloslav Ransdorf. Grebeníček stated that Exner was a candidate of Conservatives who like past.

References

Communist Party of Bohemia and Moravia leadership elections
Communist Party of Bohemia and Moravia leadership election
Indirect elections
Communist Party of Bohemia and Moravia leadership election
Communist Party of Bohemia and Moravia leadership election